The 2017 Ronde van Drenthe was the 11th running of the women's Ronde van Drenthe, a women's bicycle race in the Netherlands.

The race was won by reigning world champion, Amalie Dideriksen, who won her first race in the rainbow jersey.

Results

References

External links

2017
2017 in Dutch sport
2017 UCI Women's World Tour